Monte Groppo Rosso is a mountain in Liguria, northern Italy, part of the Ligurian Apennines.  It is located in the provinces of Genoa and Piacenza. It lies at an altitude of 1597 metres.

References

Mountains of Liguria
Mountains of Emilia-Romagna
One-thousanders of Italy
Mountains of the Apennines